The Woman I Murdered (French: La femme que j'ai assassinée) is a 1948 French drama film directed by Jacques Daniel-Norman and starring Armand Bernard, Pierre Larquey and Micheline Francey.

The film's sets were designed by the art director Raymond Druart.

Synopsis
After not taking seriously a young woman's threats to commit suicide, a businessman is shocked to read in the newspaper that her body has been discovered in the canal. Filled with remorse, he adopts her orphaned daughter and attempts to make amends through his assistance to her.

Cast
Armand Bernard as Dupont-Verneuil
Pierre Larquey as René Dufleuve
Micheline Francey as Lucienne
Charles Vanel as François Bachelin
Rivers Cadet as Le maire
Jeanne Daury as Simone 
Palmyre Levasseur as La marchande des quatre saisons
Margo Lion as La logeuse
Julien Maffre as Le pêcheur
Philippe Mareuil as Jean
Jane Marken as Maria Le Querrec
Georges Paulais as Benjamin
Robert Pizani as Arthur de Selve
Philippe Richard as André
Émile Ronet as Cordier
Georges Sauval as L'éclusier
Pierre Stéphen as Raoul Le Hardouin
Lucy Valnor as Lucienne enfant
Roger Vincent as 	Le père de Jean

References

Bibliography 
Bessy, Maurice & Chirat, Raymond. ''Histoire du cinéma français: encyclopédie des films, 1940–1950. Pygmalion, 1986

External links 

1948 films
1948 drama films
French drama films
1940s French-language films
Films directed by Jacques Daniel-Norman
1940s French films

fr:La Femme que j'ai assassinée